Koibal dialect is a dialect of the Kamassian language or arguably another independent Sayan Samoyed language. About 600 words of the Koibal dialect are known, but there are no grammatical descriptions of Koibal. The vocabulary of Koibal is very similar to Kamassian proper dialect. The Koibal dialect died around the 19th century. The Koibals assimilated into Turkic tribes There was a Koibal-Russian glossary published in 1806. 

Kamassian proper distinguishes the alveo-dental and palatal sibilants s, z vs. š, ž, however the Koibal dialect only has s and z.

Vocabulary

References

External links 
Koibal dictionary

Southern Samoyedic languages
Extinct languages of Asia
Languages of Russia